is a Japanese manga series written and illustrated by Kazunori Tahara. It was serialized in Shogakukan's seinen manga magazine Monthly Big Comic Spirits from August 2009 to July 2013, with its chapters collected in six tankōbon volumes.

Publication
Shogakukan collected its chapters in six tankōbon volumes, released from April 28, 2010, to August 30, 2013.

Volume list

See also
Peach Milk Crown—Another manga series by the same author.

References

Shogakukan manga
Seinen manga